Elaine Runting Shi is a Chinese and American computer scientist and cryptographer, whose research has included work on blockchain and smart contracts, secure distributed systems, and the oblivious RAM model, and cryptographic techniques for encrypted computation. She is an associate professor of computer science at Cornell University.

Education and career
Shi is originally from Hangzhou, and did her undergraduate studies at Tsinghua University before completing her doctorate in 2008 at Carnegie Mellon University. Her dissertation, Evaluating Predicates over Encrypted Data, was supervised by Adrian Perrig.

She worked as a researcher at PARC and the University of California, Berkeley, and as an assistant professor at the University of Maryland, College Park before joining the Cornell faculty in 2015.

She is a recipient of a Packard Fellowship, a Sloan Fellowship, an ONR YIP award, and various other best paper awards.

References

External links
Home page
DBLP page

Year of birth missing (living people)
Living people
American computer scientists
American women computer scientists
Chinese computer scientists
Chinese women computer scientists
Carnegie Mellon University alumni
University of Maryland, College Park faculty
Cornell University faculty